Mennonite Collegiate Institute (MCI) is a private high school located in Gretna, Manitoba. It has approximately 60 students from grade 9 to 12, teaching the curriculum requirements of Manitoba Education within a Christian/Anabaptist setting.  Its main purpose is to serve Mennonite students but non-Mennonite students who are open to exploring their own religious values are welcomed.

Notable alumni
Rick Neufeld, musician
Jack Thiessen, lexicographer

References

External links 
 Mennonite Collegiate Institute

Mennonite schools in Manitoba
Private schools in Manitoba
High schools in Manitoba
Educational institutions in Canada with year of establishment missing
Boarding schools in Manitoba

Pembina Valley Region